Fernanda is a Portuguese, Spanish and Italian feminine equivalent of Fernando, a male given name of Germanic origin, with an original meaning of "adventurous, bold journey".


People
Fernanda Abreu (born 1961), Brazilian popular singer
Fernanda Brandão (born 1983), Brazilian singer and dancer based in Munich, Germany
Fernanda Castillo (born 1982), Mexican actress
Fernanda Contri (born 1935), Italian jurist and politician
Fernanda Cornejo (born 1989), Ecuadorian beauty pageant titleholder, crowned Miss International Ecuador 2011
Fernanda Eberstadt (born 1960), American writer
Fernanda de Freitas (born 1980), Brazilian film, television and stage actress
Fernanda Gattinoni (1906–2002), Italian fashion designer
Fernanda G. Weiden, system administrator and a former council member of Free Software Foundation Latin America
Fernanda González (born 1990), Olympic and National record-holding backstroke swimmer from Mexico
Fernanda Hermenegildo (born 1988), professional Brazilian tennis player and former member of the Brazil Fed Cup team
Fernanda Keller (born 1963), professional triathlete from Brazil who was the first Brazilian woman to compete in the Ironman Triathlon World Championships
Fernanda Lauro (born 1978), Argentine sprint canoeist
Fernanda Lessa (born 1977), Brazilian top model
Fernanda Lima (born 1977), Brazilian actress, television hostess and model
Fernanda Lissoni (born 1980), female water polo player from Brazil
Fernanda Machado (born 1980), Brazilian film, television and stage actress
Fernanda Marlowe (born 1942), British actress
Fernanda Montenegro (born 1929), Brazilian stage, television and film actress. First Latin American actress nominated to Academy Awards for Best Actress.
Fernanda Motta (born 1981), Brazilian model, actress, and television host
Fernanda Nissen (1862–1920), Norwegian journalist, literary critic, theatre critic, politician and feminist pioneer
Fernanda Oliveira (born 1980), Brazilian sailor
Fernanda Oliveira (born 1980), Brazilian ballet dancer
Fernanda Paes Leme (born 1983), Brazilian actress
Fernanda Pires da Silva (1926–2020), Portuguese businesswoman
Fernanda Pivano (1917–2009), Italian writer, journalist, translator and critic
Fernanda Porto (born 1965), Brazilian singer of Drum 'n' Bossa
Fernanda Ribeiro (born 1993), Brazilian model
Fernanda Rodrigues (born 1979), Brazilian film and television actress and entertainer
Fernanda Romero (born 1985), Mexican actress, model and singer
Fernanda Takai (born 1971), Brazilian singer, lead vocalist of rock band Pato Fu
Fernanda Tavares (born 1980), Brazilian model
Fernanda Torres (born 1965), Brazilian movie, theatre and television actress. 1986 winner of Cannes Film Festival Award for Best Actress
Fernanda Urrejola (born 1981), Chilean television, theatre and soap opera actress
Fernanda Vasconcellos, (born 1984), Brazilian movie, theatre and television actress
Fernanda Viégas (born 1971), Brazilian scientist and designer

See also
Hurricane Fernanda (disambiguation), tropical cyclones in the Eastern Pacific Ocean

References

Italian feminine given names
Spanish feminine given names
Portuguese feminine given names